Røstlandet is an island in Røst Municipality in Nordland county, Norway. The  island makes up the majority of the land of the municipality and is home to most of its residents. There are many small lakes on the island, many of the wetlands areas on the island are located in a protected nature reserve.

The village of Røstlandet is a fishing village that covers the southeastern part of the island.  Røst Airport is located on the northern part of the island.  Røst Church is located in the village.  The remaining uninhabited parts of the island are dominated by sheep farming and racks for drying fish.

Media gallery

See also
List of islands of Norway

References

Islands of Nordland
Røst